The Reserve Division of Nenjiang was a short-lived reserve infantry formation of the People's Liberation Army active between 1984 and 1985.

The division was activated in March 1983 in Nenjiang, Heilongjiang. By then the division was then composed of:
1st Regiment
2nd Regiment - Keshan
3rd Regiment
Artillery Regiment - Baiquan

The division was likely disbanded in 1985.

References

Reserve divisions of the People's Liberation Army
Military units and formations established in 1983